Waṣf (literally 'attribute' or 'description'; pl.  ) is an ancient style of Arabic poetry, which can be characterised as descriptive verse.

Role in Arabic verse

 was one of four kinds of poetry in which medieval Arabic poets were expected to be competent, alongside 'the boast, the invective, and the elegy'.

The tradition in Arabic was highly developed, with poets often devoting entire collections to elaborate treatments of single subjects, such as hunting animals, kinds of flowers, and specific objects. [...] While one might initially be inclined to take the genre of  poetry lightly--since it involves "mere" description, in fact an argument could be made for seeing this genre as, in some instances, central to the poetry of the period.

In  love poems, each part of a lover's body is described and praised in turn, often using exotic, extravagant, or even far-fetched metaphors. The Song of Solomon is a prominent example of such a poem, and other examples can be found in Thousand and One Nights.  The images given in this type of poetry are not literally descriptive.  Instead, they convey the delight of the lover for the beloved, where the lover finds freshness and splendor in the body as a reflected image in the world. Other varieties of  include literary riddles.

Outside Arabic

This genre had a long history and later became a favorite of the troubadour poets and the authors of sonnets in the Elizabethan era. Shakespeare effectively ended this movement with his Sonnet 130 which satirized the form. For instance, the first line in that satire reads, "My mistress' eyes are nothing like the sun."

References

 Knuth, Donald E. (1990). 3:16 Bible Texts Illuminated. A.R. Editions, Inc. .

 
Arabic and Central Asian poetics
Arabic poetry forms
Arab culture
Literary genres
Arabic poetry